Ahlawat is a Jat clan and Indian surname.

Notable people bearing the name include:

 Jaideep Ahlawat (born 1980), Indian actor
 Mohit Ahlawat (actor) (born 1962), Indian actor
 Mohit Ahlawat (cricketer) (born 1995), Indian sportsman
 Mukesh Kumar Ahlawat, Indian politician

 Narender Singh Ahlawat (born 1951), Indian Army officer 
 Ch. Mahavir Singh (born 1932 on Ram Navami) s/o Ch. Sunder Singh IAS , 3 times Sarpanch of Gochhi Village ,was  Secretary of Brigadier Ran Singh College Dujana , was Sports Captain (Hockey, Tug of war , Kabaddi , Wrestling)of  All India Jat Heroes' Memorial School/College at Rohtak, Haryana.

References

Indian surnames
Social groups of Haryana
Jat clans